Ernest Pastell Givins Jr. (born September 3, 1964), is an American former professional football player who was a wide receiver for 10 seasons in the National Football League (NFL), primarily with the Houston Oilers.

High school and college
Givins attended Lakewood High School where he was a star football player. He attended Northeastern Oklahoma A&M College, then transferred to the University of Louisville. At Louisville he set records for punt return and kickoff return that still stand.

Professional career
He was selected by the Houston Oilers in the 2nd round of the 1986 NFL Draft. A , 175 lbs. wide receiver, he played in 10 NFL seasons from 1986 to 1995. 

During his rookie season, in a Week 9, 1986 game against the Miami Dolphins, Givins took a reverse and was injured after getting hit in the head/neck area and was taken off the field on a stretcher. He only missed one game and returned two weeks later in Week 11 against the Steelers.

A two-time Pro Bowl selection in 1990 and 1992, he played most of his career with the Oilers, catching passes from quarterback Warren Moon, along with receivers Curtis Duncan, Haywood Jeffires and Drew Hill in the Oilers' "run and shoot" offense.  Givins was best known for his touchdown celebration dance known as the "Electric Slide."

After nine seasons with the Oilers, Givins played one season with the Jacksonville Jaguars, then retired.

Oilers/Titans franchise records
 Most receiving yards (career): 7,935 
 Receptions (career): 542

Post-professional career
He is very active in St. Petersburg's football community. In the mid-1990s, he was offensive coordinator of his high school alma mater, Pinellas Lakewood High School.

Coaching career
Givins served as head coach of St. Petersburg semi-pro football team, the St. Pete Sharks (Suncoast Semi-pro Football League). 
Givins served as head coach of the Sarasota Millionaires (initially in the United Football Federation and as of 2014 in the Florida Football Alliance (FFA), from 2012 to 2014.  
On May 26, 2017, Givins was named head coach of the Dunedin Pirates (Florida Football Alliance) based in Dunedin, Florida.

Givins has been the offensive coordinator for Boca Ciega High School's football team. He also works at Bay Point Middle School in St. Petersburg as a campus monitor.

Personal life
Givins' brother, Anthony, is the head coach of the St. Petersburg-based University of Faith football team.

References

External links

1964 births
Living people
American football wide receivers
American football tight ends
Louisville Cardinals football players
Houston Oilers players
Jacksonville Jaguars players
American Conference Pro Bowl players
Players of American football from St. Petersburg, Florida